Charles Théodore Blachier (6 February 1859, Geneva – 5 October 1915, Geneva) was a Swiss entomologist who specialised in Lepidoptera.

Blachier taught Grammar.

He was a Member of the Société entomologique de France. His collections of Palearctic Lepidoptera are held by the Natural History Museum of Geneva.

Works
1905 Descriptions sommaires d'espèces et de variétés nouvelles de Lépidoptères paléarctiques Bulletin de la Société Entomologique de France 1905: 52-54
1905 Descriptions de Lépidoptères nouveaux du Maroc. Bulletin de la Société Entomologique de France:212-215.
1908 Lépidoptères du Maroc - Remarque sur diverses espèces et descriptions de variétés nouvelles Ann. Soc. ent. Fr. 77 (2) : 209-222
1912 Espèces ou formes nouvelles de Lépidoptères africains appartenant aux genres Acraea et Mylothris. Bulletin de la Société Lépidoptérologique de Genève 2:173-177.

References
Oberthür, C. 1916: [Brown, F. R. F.] Etudes de lepidopterologie comparée 11
Anon.1915 [Blachier, C. T.] Bulletin de la Société Entomologique de France, Paris 1915: 250 [full text]
 Reverdin, J.L. 1916. Ch. Blachier (avec portrait). Bulletin de la Société Lépidoptérologique de Genève 3:109-112
Bethune-Baker, G. T. 1916 [Blachier, C. T.] Entomologist's Record and Journal of Variation, London 28

Swiss lepidopterists
1859 births
1915 deaths